Las Breñas is a city in Chaco Province, Argentina. It is the head town of the Nueve de Julio Department.

The economy of Las Breñas is centrad around agriculture and farming. It is home to an Instituto Nacional de Tecnología Agropecuaria facility.

Climate
The climate of Las Breñas is classified as subtropical with dry winters, which under the Köppen climate classification would be classified as a humid subtropical climate (Cwa). In contrast winters are mild with cool nights and temperatures can be very low with the lowest temperature recorded being  on July 20, 1957. With the average first and last dates of frost being May 31 and September 3 respectively, Las Breñas has a frost free period of 256 days although frosts as early as April 15 and as late as October 6 has occurred.

From May to September, which are the cooler months, they are dry, with these 5 months only registering 14% of the total annual precipitation.

References

External links

 Municipal website

Populated places in Chaco Province